A kiss-me-quick hat is  a British seaside novelty hat, typically bearing the words "Kiss me quick" or "Kiss me quick, squeeze me slow".  Culturally, The Daily Telegraph describes them as "one step up from a knotted handkerchief".

Rhyming slang and derivative terms
"Kiss me quick" has been used as rhyming slang for "prick".   Also used as an -ism as in  "kiss-me-kwik seaside towns." - describing "cheap, dated, seaside towns" according to Partridge.

See also
Buntal hat
Breton (hat)
Boater
Panama hat
Rock (confectionery)
Sailor hat
Straw hat
Sun hat

References

Headgear